The 2000 Northern Ford Premiership season was the second tier of British rugby league during the 2000 season. The competition featured eighteen teams, with Dewsbury Rams finishing as league leaders and winning the Grand Final.

Championship
The league was won by the Dewsbury Rams. The Dewsbury Rams also reached the Grand Final and defeated Leigh Centurions, with Leigh Centurions' Mick Higham winning the Tom Bergin Trophy. The Dewsbury Rams were not promoted to the Super League however, as their stadium did not meet the minimum requirements to be accepted into the league.

League table

Play-offs

Grand Final

See also
2000 Challenge Cup

References

External links

2000 season at wigan.rlfans.com

Rugby Football League Championship
Northern Ford Premiership